Suicide prevention is a collection of efforts to reduce the risk of suicide. Suicide is often preventable, and the efforts to prevent it may occur at the individual, relationship, community, and society level. Suicide is a serious public health problem that can have long-lasting effects on individuals, families, and communities. Preventing suicide requires strategies at all levels of society. This includes prevention and protective strategies for individuals, families, and communities. Suicide can be prevented by learning the warning signs, promoting prevention and resilience, and committing to social change.  

Beyond direct interventions to stop an impending suicide, methods may include: 
 treating mental illness
 improving coping strategies of people who are at risk
 reducing risk factors for suicide, such as poverty and social vulnerability
 giving people hope for a better life after current problems are resolved
 calling a suicide hotline number

General efforts include measures within the realms of medicine, mental health, and public health. Because protective factors such as social support and social engagement—as well as environmental risk factors such as access to lethal means— play a role in suicide, suicide is not solely a medical or mental-health issue.

Interventions

Lethal-means reduction

Means reduction ⁠— ⁠reducing the odds that a suicide attempter will use highly lethal means ⁠— ⁠is an important component of suicide prevention. This practice is also called "means restriction". It has been demonstrated that restricting lethal means can help reduce suicide rates, as delaying action until the desire to die has passed. In general, strong evidence supports the effectiveness of means restriction in preventing suicides. There is also strong evidence that restricted access at so-called suicide hotspots, such as bridges and cliffs, reduces suicides, whereas other interventions such as placing signs or increasing surveillance at these sites appears less effective. 

One of the most famous historical examples of means reduction is that of coal gas in the United Kingdom. Until the 1950s, the most common means of suicide in the UK was poisoning by gas inhalation. In 1958, natural gas (virtually free of carbon monoxide) was introduced, and over the next decade, comprised over 50% of gas used. As carbon monoxide in gas decreased, suicides also decreased. The decrease was driven entirely by dramatic decreases in the number of suicides by carbon monoxide poisoning. A 2020 Cochrane review on means restrictions for jumping found tentative evidence of reductions in frequency.

In the United States, firearm access is associated with increased suicide completion. About 85% of suicide attempts with a gun result in death, while most other widely used suicide attempt methods result in death less than 5% of the time. Matthew Miller, M.D., Sc.D. conducted research comparing the number of suicides in states with the highest rates of gun ownership, to the number of suicides in states with the lowest rates of gun ownership. He found that men were 3.7 times more likely to die by firearm suicide and women were 7.9 times more likely to die by firearm suicide living in states with high rates of gun ownership. There was no difference in non-firearm suicides. Although restrictions on access to firearms have reduced firearm suicide rates in other countries, such restrictions are difficult in the United States because the Second Amendment to the United States Constitution limits restrictions on weapons.

Crisis hotline

Crisis hotlines connect a person in distress to either a volunteer or staff member. This may occur via telephone, online chat, or in person. Even though crisis hotlines are common, they have not been well studied. One study found a decrease in psychological pain, hopelessness, and desire to die from the beginning of the call through the next few weeks; however, the desire to die did not decrease long term.

Social intervention
In the United States, the 2012 National Strategy for Suicide Prevention promotes various specific suicide prevention efforts including:

 Developing groups led by professionally trained individuals for broad-based support for suicide prevention.
 Promoting community-based suicide prevention programs.
 Screening and reducing at-risk behavior through psychological resilience programs that promotes optimism and connectedness.
 Education about suicide, including risk factors, warning signs, stigma related issues and the availability of help through social campaigns.
 Increasing the proficiency of health and welfare services at responding to people in need. e.g., sponsored training for helping professionals, increased access to community linkages, employing crisis counseling organizations.
 Reducing domestic violence and substance abuse through legal and empowerment means are long-term strategies.
 Reducing access to convenient means of suicide and methods of self-harm. e.g., toxic substances, poisons, handguns.
 Reducing the quantity of dosages supplied in packages of non-prescription medicines e.g., aspirin.
 School-based competency promoting and skill enhancing programs.
 Interventions and usage of ethical surveillance systems targeted at high-risk groups.
 Improving reporting and portrayals of negative behavior, suicidal behavior, mental illness and substance abuse in the entertainment and news media.
 Research on protective factors & development of effective clinical and professional practices.

Media guidelines
Recommendations around media reporting of suicide include not sensationalizing the event or attributing it to a single cause. It is also recommended that media messages include suicide prevention messages such as stories of hope and links to further resources. Particular care is recommended when the person who died is famous. Specific details of the method or the location are not recommended.

There is little evidence, however, regarding the benefit of providing resources for those looking for help and the evidence for media guidelines generally is mixed at best.

TV shows and news media may also be able to help prevent suicide by linking suicide with negative outcomes such as pain for the person who has attempted suicide and their survivors, conveying that the majority of people choose something other than suicide in order to solve their problems, avoiding mentioning suicide epidemics, and avoiding presenting authorities or sympathetic, ordinary people as spokespersons for the reasonableness of suicide.

Medication
The medication lithium may be useful in certain situations to reduce the risk of suicide. Specifically it is effective at lowering the risk of suicide in those with bipolar disorder and major depressive disorder.
Some antidepressant medications may increase suicidal ideation in some patients under certain conditions.

Counseling
There are multiple talk therapies that reduce suicidal thoughts and behaviors including dialectical behavior therapy (DBT). Cognitive behavior therapy for suicide prevention (CBT-SP) is a form of DBT adapted for adolescents at high risk for repeated suicide attempts. The brief intervention and contact technique developed by the World Health Organization also has shown benefit.

The World Health Organization recommends "specific skills should be available in the education system to prevent bullying and violence in and around the school".

Coping planning
Coping planning is a strengths-based intervention that aims to meet the needs of people who ask for help, including those experiencing suicidal ideation. By addressing why someone asks for help, the risk assessment and management stays on what the person needs, and the needs assessment focuses on the individual needs of each person. The coping planning approach to suicide prevention draws on the health-focused theory of coping. Coping is normalized as a normal and universal human response to unpleasant emotions, and interventions are considered a change continuum of low intensity (e.g., self-soothing) to high intensity support (e.g. professional help). By planning for coping, it supports people who are distressed and provides a sense of belongingness and resilience in treatment of illness. The proactive coping planning approach overcomes implications of ironic process theory. The biopsychosocial strategy of training people in healthy coping improves emotional regulation and decreases memories of unpleasant emotions. A good coping planning strategically reduces the inattentional blindness for a person while developing resilience and regulation strengths.

Strategies

The traditional approach has been to identify the risk factors that increase suicide or self-harm, though meta-analysis studies suggest that suicide risk assessment might not be useful and recommend immediate hospitalization of the person with suicidal feelings as the healthy choice. In 2001, the U.S. Department of Health and Human Services, published the National Strategy for Suicide Prevention, establishing a framework for suicide prevention in the U.S. The document, and its 2012 revision, calls for a public health approach to suicide prevention, focusing on identifying patterns of suicide and suicidal ideation throughout a group or population (as opposed to exploring the history and health conditions that could lead to suicide in a single individual). The ability to recognize warning signs of suicide allows individuals who may be concerned about someone they know to direct them to help.

Suicide gesture and suicidal desire (a vague wish for death without any actual intent to kill oneself) are potentially self-injurious behaviors that a person may use to attain some other ends, like to seek help, punish others, or to receive attention. This behavior has the potential to aid an individual's capability for suicide and can be considered as a suicide warning, when the person shows intent through verbal and behavioral signs.

Specific strategies
Suicide prevention strategies focus on reducing the risk factors and intervening strategically to reduce the level of risk. Risk and protective factors unique to the individual can be assessed by a qualified mental health professional.

Some of the specific strategies used to address are:
 Crisis intervention.
 Structured counseling and psychotherapy.
 Hospitalization for those with low adherence to collaboration for help and those who require monitoring and secondary symptom treatment.
 Supportive therapy like substance abuse treatment, Psychotropic medication, Family psychoeducation and Access to emergency phone call care with emergency rooms, suicide prevention hotlines, etc.
 Restricting access to lethality of suicide means through policies and laws.
 Creating and using crisis cards, an easy-to-read uncluttered card that describes a list of activities one should follow in crisis until the positive behavior responses settles in the personality.
 Person-centered life skills training. e.g., Problem solving.
 Registering with support groups like Alcoholics Anonymous, Suicide Bereavement Support Group, a religious group with flow rituals, etc.
 Therapeutic recreational therapy that improves mood.
 Motivating self-care activities like physical exercises and meditative relaxation.

Psychotherapies that have shown most successful or evidence based are dialectical behavior therapy (DBT), which has shown to be helpful in reducing suicide attempts and reducing hospitalizations for suicidal ideation and cognitive behavioral therapy (CBT), which has shown to improve problem-solving and coping abilities.

After a suicide
Postvention is for people affected by an individual's suicide. This intervention facilitates grieving, guides to reduce guilt, guides to reduce anxiety and depression, and helps to decrease the effects of trauma. Bereavement is ruled out and promoted for catharsis and supporting their adaptive capacities before intervening depression and any psychiatric disorders. Postvention is also provided to minimize the risk of imitative or copycat suicides, but there is a lack of evidence based standard protocol. The general goal of the mental health practitioner is to decrease the likelihood of others identifying with the suicidal behavior of the deceased as a coping strategy in dealing with adversity.

Risk assessment

Warning signs 
Warning signs of suicide can allow individuals to direct people who may be considering suicide to get help.

Behaviors that may be warning signs include:
 Talking about wanting to die or wanting to kill themselves
 Suicidal ideation: thinking, talking, or writing about suicide, planning for suicide
 Substance abuse
 Feelings of purposelessness
 Anxiety, agitation, being unable to sleep, or sleeping all the time
 Feelings of being trapped
 Feelings of hopelessness
 Social withdrawal
 Displaying extreme mood swings, suddenly changing from sad to very calm or happy
 Recklessness or impulsiveness, taking risks that could lead to death, such as driving extremely fast
 Mood changes including depression
 Feelings of uselessness
 Settling outstanding affairs, giving away prized or valuable possessions, or making amends when they are otherwise not expected to die (as an example, this behavior would be typical in a terminal cancer patient but not a healthy young adult)
 Strong feelings of pain, either emotional or physical 
 Considering oneself burdensome
 Increased use of drugs or alcohol

Additionally, the National Institute for Mental Health includes feeling burdensome, and strong feelings of pain—either emotional or physical—as warning signs that someone may attempt suicide.

Direct talks 
An effective way to assess suicidal thoughts is to talk with the person directly, to ask about depression, and assess suicide plans as to how and when it might be attempted. Contrary to popular misconceptions, talking with people about suicide does not plant the idea in their heads. However, such discussions and questions should be asked with care, concern and compassion. The tactic is to reduce sadness and provide assurance that other people care. The WHO advises to not say everything will be all right nor make the problem seem trivial, nor give false assurances about serious issues. The discussions should be gradual and specifically executed when the person is comfortable about discussing their feelings. ICARE (Identify the thought, Connect with it, Assess evidence for it, Restructure the thought in positive light, Express or provide room for expressing feelings from the restructured thought) is a model of approach used here.

Screening 
The U.S. Surgeon General has suggested that screening to detect those at risk of suicide may be one of the most effective means of preventing suicide in children and adolescents. There are various screening tools in the form of self-report questionnaires to help identify those at risk such as the Beck Hopelessness Scale and Is Path Warm?. A number of these self-report questionnaires have been tested and found to be effective for use among adolescents and young adults. There is however a high rate of false-positive identification and those deemed to be at risk should ideally have a follow-up clinical interview. The predictive quality of these screening questionnaires has not been conclusively validated so it is not possible to determine if those identified at risk of suicide will actually die by suicide. Asking about or screening for suicide does not create or increase the risk.

In approximately 75 percent of suicides, the individuals had seen a physician within the year before their death, including 45 to 66 percent within the prior month. Approximately 33 to 41 percent of those who died by suicide had contact with mental health services in the prior year, including 20 percent within the prior month. These studies suggest an increased need for effective screening. Many suicide risk assessment measures are not sufficiently validated, and do not include all three core suicidality attributes (i.e., suicidal affect, behavior, and cognition). A study published by the University of New South Wales has concluded that asking about suicidal thoughts cannot be used as a reliable predictor of suicide risk.

Underlying condition 
The conservative estimate is that 10% of individuals with psychiatric disorders may have an undiagnosed medical condition causing their symptoms, with some estimates stating that upwards of 50% may have an undiagnosed medical condition which, if not causing, is exacerbating their psychiatric symptoms. Illegal drugs and prescribed medications may also produce psychiatric symptoms. Effective diagnosis and, if necessary, medical testing, which may include neuroimaging to diagnose and treat any such medical conditions or medication side effects, may reduce the risk of suicidal ideation as a result of psychiatric symptoms. Most often including depression, which are present in up to 90–95% of cases.

Risk factors
All people can be at risk of suicide. Risk factors that contribute to someone feeling suicidal or making a suicide attempt may include:
Depression, other mental disorders, or substance abuse disorder
Certain medical conditions
Chronic pain
A prior suicide attempt
Family history of a mental disorder or substance abuse
Family history of suicide
Family violence, including physical or sexual abuse
Psychiatric Abuse
Benzodiazepines
Having guns or other firearms in the home
Having recently been released from prison, jail or mental asylum
Self-harm 
Being exposed to others' suicidal behavior, such as that of family members, peers, or celebrities
Being male

Legislation

Support organizations

Many non-profit organizations exist, such as the American Foundation for Suicide Prevention in the United States, which serve as crisis hotlines; it has benefited from at least one crowd-sourced campaign. The first documented program aimed at preventing suicide was initiated in 1906 in both New York, the National Save-A-Life League, and in London, the Suicide Prevention Department of the Salvation Army.

Suicide prevention interventions fall into two broad categories: prevention targeted at the level of the individual and prevention targeted at the level of the population. To identify, review, and disseminate information about best practices to address specific objectives of the National Strategy Best Practices Registry (BPR) was initiated. The Best Practices Registry of Suicide Prevention Resource Center is a registry of various suicide intervention programs maintained by the American Association of Suicide Prevention. The programs are divided, with those in Section I listing evidence-based programs: interventions which have been subjected to in depth review and for which evidence has demonstrated positive outcomes. Section III programs have been subjected to review.

Examples of support organizations 
 American Foundation for Suicide Prevention
 Befrienders Worldwide
 Campaign Against Living Miserably
 Crisis Text Line
 International Association for Suicide Prevention
 The Jed Foundation
 National Suicide Prevention Lifeline
 Samaritans
 Suicide Prevention Action Network USA 
 Trans Lifeline
 The Trevor Project

Economics
Although there are lasting emotional effects on families due to suicide, the economic effects are contagious. In the United States it is estimated that an episode of suicide results in costs of about $1.3 million. 97 percent of these costs are due to the loss in career productivity from the deceased individual as well as the after-effect toll on families. Likewise, the remaining 3 percent of the expenses were contributed from medical expenses. Money spending on appropriated interventions is estimated to result in a decrease in economic losses that are 2.5-fold greater than the amount spent. Therefore, declaring the need for increased actions in intervention and prevention to help uphold individuals, families, and the economy.

See also

References

Further reading
 Suicide prevention and assessment handbook, Centre for Addiction and Mental Health, 2011.

External links
CDC website on Suicide Prevention
The Suicide Prevention Resource Center (SPRC) provides prevention support, training, and resources to assist organizations and individuals to develop suicide prevention programs, interventions and policies, and to advance the National Strategy for Suicide Prevention.
Centre for Suicide Prevention (CSP), Canada
Suicide Prevention:Effectiveness and Evaluation A 32-page guide from SPAN USA, the National Center for Injury Prevention and Control, and Education Development Center, Inc.
International Association for Suicide Prevention Organization co-sponsors World Suicide Prevention Day on September 10 every year with the World Health Organization (WHO).
 U.S. Surgeon General – Suicide Prevention
 Suicide Risk Assessment Guide – VA Reference Manual
 Practice Guidelines for Suicide prevention, APA

 
Counseling